The FreePBX Distro is a freeware unified communications software system that consists of a graphical user interface (GUI) for configuring, controlling, and managing Asterisk PBX software. The FreePBX Distro includes packages that offer VoIP, PBX, Fax, IVR, voice-mail and email functions.

The FreePBX Distro Linux distribution is based on CentOS, which maintains binary compatibility with Red Hat Enterprise Linux. FreePBX has contributed to the popularity of Asterisk.

Installation 
The Official FreePBX Distro is installed from a CD-ROM image available by web download, that includes the system CentOS, Asterisk, FreePBX GUI and assorted dependencies.

Support for telephony hardware 
The FreePBX Distro has built-in support for cards from multiple vendors, including Digium, OpenVox, Alto, Rhino Equipment, Xorcom and Sangoma.

The FreePBX Distro supports a large number of phone models via open-source modules.

Development
FreePBX made its debut in 2004 as the AMP project (Asterisk Management Portal).  The FreePBX Distro was released in 2011 as an All-In-One solution for building a PBX using Asterisk, CentOS and FreePBX.

FreePBX has over 1 million active production PBXs and over 20,000 new systems added each month. Supported PBX phone manufacturers include Aastra Technologies, Algo, AND, Audiocodes, Cisco Systems, Cyberdata, Digium, Grandstream, Mitel, Panasonic, Polycom, Sangoma, Snom, Xorcom and Yealink.

The core telephony engine is Asterisk (PBX), as configured by the Open Source FreePBX GUI.

The latest stable release is FreePBX Distro Stable SNG7-PBX16-64bit-2208-2 based on these main components:
FreePBX 16
CentOS 7.8
Asterisk 16, 18 or 19

References

External links 
 

VoIP software
FreePBX
Asterisk (PBX)
Telecommunications